The National Agency for Computer Security is the Tunisian national computer security agency. It was founded in 2004 and it is based in Tunis, Tunisia. Its Director General is Ali GHRIB.

References

External links 
 

Government agencies established in 2004
Information technology organizations based in Africa
Organisations based in Tunisia